Below are the squads for the Football at the 2009 Mediterranean Games, hosted in Pescara, Italy, and took place between 25 June and 5 July 2009. Teams were national U-20 sides.

Group A

Greece

Italy
Head coach: Francesco Rocca

Syria

Group B

France
Head coach: Luc Rabat

Malta

Turkey

Group C

Libya

Montenegro
Head coach: Dušan Vlaisavljević

Morocco

Group D

Albania
Head coach: Artan Bushati

Spain
Head coach: Luis Milla

Tunisia

References

Squads
Mediterranean Games football squads